Chatelain may refer to:

 Châtelain, the French equivalent of the English castellan, i.e. the commander of a castle
 Chatelain (surname)
 Châtelain, Mayenne,s a commune in the Mayenne department in north-western France
 Camblain-Châtelain, a commune in the Pas-de-Calais department in the Nord-Pas-de-Calais region of France
 Lignières-Châtelain, a commune in the Somme department in Picardie in northern France
 USS Chatelain (DE-149), a destroyer escort built for the U.S. Navy during World War II

See also

 Chatelaine (disambiguation)
 Chastel (disambiguation)
 Chatel (disambiguation)
 Chateau (disambiguation)